The PS Hankow was an iron paddle steamer built at A and J Inglis, Pointhouse, Glasgow with Yard No. 107.  She was transferred in 1886 from Yangtze to Hong Kong/Canton service. Gutted by fire on 14 October 1906 at Canton Steamer Wharf, Hong Kong with loss of 130 lives. Towed to Shanghai in 1907 and converted to hulk and moved to Hankow as transhipment godown. Transferred to Shasi in 1930, and to Ichang in 1938. Destroyed by American bombing during WW2.

References

External links
The Burned Steamer Hankow (photo)
 https://wikiswire.com/wiki/Hankow

1873 ships
Ships built in Glasgow
Paddle steamers